Trevor John McKee  (22 September 1937 – 5 April 2019) was a New Zealand Thoroughbred racehorse trainer. He was best known as the trainer, in partnership with his son Stephen, of the champion racehorse Sunline.

Biography 
McKee was born in the Thames Valley and started his racing career as a jockey.  He trained at Takanini and for a while in partnership with Colin Curnow and later in partnership with his son Stephen, before retiring in 2006.

McKee trained or co-trained a number of other high-class horses, including:
  
 Bisett, winner of the 1981 Wellesley Stakes
 Bunker, winner of the 2002 Hawke's Bay Guineas
 Ebony Honour, winner of the 2005 Trentham Stakes
 Flying Luskin, winner of the 1990 Trentham Stakes, Wellington Cup and Challenge Stakes
 Interval, winner of the 1997 Awapuni Gold Cup, New Zealand St. Leger and Trentham Stakes
 Moonshine, winner of the 1994 Manawatu Sires Produce Stakes and Ellerslie Sires Produce Stakes.
 Natural, winner of the 1984 Great Northern Foal Stakes 
 Royal Tiara, winner of the 1985 Auckland Cup
 Solveig, winner of the 1985 New Zealand Oaks, 1986 Avondale Cup and Captain Cook Stakes
 Super Fiesta, winner of the 1989 Ellerslie Sires Produce Stakes

In the 2002 New Year Honours, McKee was appointed an Officer of the New Zealand Order of Merit, for services to racing and the community.

See also

 Roger James
 Graeme Rogerson

References 

1937 births
2019 deaths
Officers of the New Zealand Order of Merit
New Zealand racehorse trainers
Sportspeople from Waikato